Tour CBX or Tour Dexia is an office skyscraper located in Supercomplex 2 of the La Défense business district situated west of Paris, France.

Built from 2002 to 2005, the tower is 142 metres tall. The tower is built nearby the La Défense circular boulevard on its northern side, and a pedestrian bridge connects it to the district's esplanade on the southern side. The CBX tower is also one of the few towers in La Défense having an inclined roof.

The CBX Tower has its name in the name of attributed codes to the buildings in the plan mass of the Defense.  For example:

 PB12 (Puteaux - office building - 12th location), that is today the Tower Opus 12.
 CH13 (Courbevoie - dwelling building - 13th location), that is the residence Vision 80.

When the tower is looked at from the west, its shape recalls the shape of the Flatiron Building built in 1902 in New York City.

See also 
 Skyscraper
 La Défense
 List of tallest structures in Paris

External links 

 Tour CBX (Emporis)
 Tour CBX (Paris Skyscrapers)

CBX
CBX
Kohn Pedersen Fox buildings
Office buildings completed in 2005
21st-century architecture in France